The 1926 Harvard Crimson football team represented Harvard University in the 1926 college football season. In its first season under head coach Arnold Horween, Harvard compiled a 3–5 record and outscored opponents by a total of 140 to 105. Clement D. Coady was the team captain. The team played its home games at Harvard Stadium in Boston.

Schedule

References

Harvard
Harvard Crimson football seasons
Harvard Crimson football
1920s in Boston